This is a list of seasons completed by the Ohio State Buckeyes men's ice hockey team.  The list documents the season-by-season records of the Buckeyes from 1963 to present, including conference and national post season records.

Season-by-season results

* Winning percentage is used when conference schedules are unbalanced.† Jerry Welsh resigned in February after being told his contract would not be renewed.

Footnotes

References

 
Lists of college men's ice hockey seasons in the United States
Ohio sports-related lists